A strong earthquake struck southern Ecuador on 18 March 2023. It caused major damage and 16 fatalities in the provinces of El Oro, Azuay and Guayas, while two additional fatalities and dozens of injuries were reported in Peru.

Tectonic setting
The active tectonics of Ecuador is dominated by the effects of the subduction of the Nazca Plate beneath the South American Plate. Ecuador lies within the Northern Volcanic Zone where the subduction zone is moving at a rate of 7 cm/yr to the east-northeast, significantly oblique to the trend of this segment of the Andes. The subduction zone has an overall dip of 25–30°, but varies rapidly along strike due to the effects of subduction of the Carnegie Ridge. The Carnegie Ridge is an oceanic plateau that formed as the Nazca Plate passed over the Galapagos hotspot. The plate interface above the subducted part of the ridge has a shallower dip than the area to both north and south, the boundaries interpreted to consist of two large tears in the downgoing Nazca Plate. The northern part of Ecuador overlies the subducted part of the Carnegie Ridge and is an area where the Nazca Plate is interpreted to be strongly coupled to the South American Plate, causing an unusually large degree of intraplate deformation. The main active fault zones of Ecuador are SSW-NNE trending dextral strike-slip faults running parallel to the main subdivisions of the Andes, two major SW-NE dextral strike-slip zones, the Pallatanga and Chingual faults, and north–south trending reverse faults such as the Quito fault. Large earthquakes are common in Ecuador. In the past century, 32 earthquakes M6.0 and larger have occurred within 250 km of this event. On 16 April 2016, a magnitude 7.8 earthquake on the subduction zone interface ~350 km north of the 2023 event resulted in over 600 deaths and over 27,000 injuries.

Earthquake
The earthquake had a magnitude of 6.8 and maximum MMI intensity of VII (Very strong), according to the United States Geological Survey. The European-Mediterranean Seismological Centre reported a magnitude of 6.7. According to PAGER, a service operated by the USGS, damaging shaking of intensities V-VII (Moderate-Very Strong) were felt by 8.41 million people, nearly half of Ecuador's population, including intensity VI (Strong) in Guayaquil. It was felt in 13 of the country's 24 provinces.

The earthquake occurred as the result of oblique-slip faulting at an intermediate depth near the subduction interface of the Nazca and South American plates. Its faulting mechanism and depth suggest the event occurred within the subducted lithosphere of the Nazca Plate. Focal mechanism solutions indicate that rupture occurred on either a near vertically dipping fault striking to the southeast or a moderately dipping fault striking to the southwest. Earthquakes in Ecuador and most of western South America are caused by the strains generated by ongoing subduction.

Events such as this are called intermediate-depth earthquakes, occurring at  depth. Intermediate-depth earthquakes represent deformation within subducted slabs rather than at the shallow plate interface between subducting and overriding tectonic plates. Typically less damaging on the ground surface above their epicenter than is the case with similar-magnitude shallow-focus earthquakes, but can still be destructive. Large intermediate-depth earthquakes may be felt at large distances from their epicenters.

Impact

Ecuador
The quake was felt in 13 of the country's 24 provinces. A total of 84 houses collapsed and 180 houses, 80 schools, 33 health facilities, 14 public infrastructure, 20 private infrastructure, and one bridge were damaged. At least 446 people were injured across the country.

El Oro
In El Oro, 40 houses collapsed and 12 people – including an infant and five members of a single family – were killed, mostly in the city of Machala. Three people died when a tower collapsed. In Puerto Bolívar, a building housing a museum and a restaurant collapsed into the sea. Collapsed buildings in the province trapped many people. One Peruvian resident was among the dead in the province.

Guayas 
In Guayaquil, 46 buildings and houses were damaged, glass was broken, some walls collapsed, and stores were closed across the city. Power outages affected the city, with the northern and southern sectors had no electricity for as long as seven hours, while in some other areas, electricity was restored after 30 minutes. Three vehicle tunnels in the city were also closed, and one person was injured. One person died in Naranjal. On Puná Island, one of the closest areas to the epicenter, 10 houses collapsed.

Azuay 
Two people died in Cuenca, the provincial capital, including one person killed when a house façade collapsed onto a car; another two were injured. Two houses were destroyed and another four were damaged in the province.

Peru
In Tumbes, close to Peru's border with Ecuador, a four-year-old girl was killed when the roof of a house fell, while a teenager was killed after a house collapsed. Another child was injured, and some were also affected landslides. Five houses collapsed, and 38 houses, two health facilities and four schools were damaged in the region's three provinces. Thirty-three people were left homeless and another 102 were affected.

Response
The Ecuadorian Secretariat for Risk Management said firefighters were deployed in search and rescue operations. The National Police conducted damage assessments. President Guillermo Lasso urged citizens to remain calm, adding that "Emergency teams are mobilising to offer all their support to those who have been affected," Toppled power lines interrupting communication and electricity services hampered rescue work. Three facilities of Petroecuador suspended operations temporarily.

Ecuador's president, Guillermo Lasso, visited the affected provinces on 19 March. He said number of deaths and injuries could rise over the next hours. Emergency funds for health and housing were activated. The Confederation of Indigenous Nationalities of Ecuador initiated an aid campaign for the affected.

See also

List of earthquakes in 2023
List of earthquakes in Ecuador
List of earthquakes in Peru

References

2023 earthquakes
2023 disasters in Ecuador
2023 disasters in Peru
March 2023 events in Ecuador
March 2023 events in Peru
Earthquakes in Ecuador
Earthquakes in Peru
2023 earthquake